was a Japanese historian and moral philosopher.

Early life 
Watsuji was born in Himeji, Hyōgo Prefecture to a physician. During his youth he enjoyed poetry and had a passion for Western literature. For a short time he was the coeditor of a literary magazine and was involved in writing poems and plays. His interests in philosophy came to light while he was a student at First Higher School in Tokyo, although his interest in literature would always remain strong throughout his life.

In his early writings (between 1913 and 1915) he introduced the work of Søren Kierkegaard to Japan, as well as working on Friedrich Nietzsche, but in 1918 he turned against this earlier position, criticizing Western philosophical individualism, and attacking its influence on Japanese thought and life. This led to a study of the roots of Japanese culture, including Japanese Buddhist art, and notably the work of the medieval Zen Buddhist Dōgen. Watsuji was also interested in the famous Japanese writer Natsume Sōseki, whose books were influential during Watsuji's early years.

Career
In the early 1920s Watsuji taught at Toyo, Hosei and Keio universities, and at Tsuda Eigaku-juku (now, Tsuda University).

The issues of hermeneutics attracted his attention, especially the hermeneutics of Boeckh and Dilthey.

In March 1925, Watsuji became a lecturer at Kyoto Imperial University, joining the other leading philosophers of the time, Nishida Kitaro, Tanabe Hajime and Nishitani Keiji. These three philosophers were members of the Kyoto School. While Watsuji joined their department, he is not typically considered a member of the School due to the intellectual independence in his work. In July, he was promoted to associate professor of ethics.

In January 1927, it was decided that he would go to Germany for 3 years for his research on the history of moral thought. He departed on 17th February and finally arrived in Berlin in early April. In the beginning of summer, he read Heidegger’s Being and Time which had just come out. He then went to Paris. He left Paris in early December and arrived in Genoa on the 12th of that month.

From January to March 1928, he travelled to Rome, Naples, Sicily, Florence, Bologna, Ravenna, Padua and Venice. He then cut his trip short, returning to Japan in early July. So his stay in Europe only lasted for roughly a year.

In March 1931, he was promoted to full professor at Kyoto Imperial University.

He then moved to the Tokyo Imperial University in July 1934 and held the chair in ethics until his retirement in March 1949.

During World War II his theories (which claimed the superiority of Japanese approaches to and understanding of human nature and ethics, and argued for the negation of self) provided support for Japanese nationalism, a fact which, after the war, he said that he regretted.

Watsuji died at the age of 71.

Work
Watsuji's three main works were his two-volume 1954 History of Japanese Ethical Thought, his three-volume Ethics, first published in 1937, 1942, and 1949, and his 1935 Climate. The last of these develops his most distinctive thought. In it, Watsuji argues for an essential relationship between climate and other environmental factors and the nature of human cultures, and he distinguished three types of culture: pastoral, desert, and monsoon.

Watsuji wrote that Kendo involves raising a struggle to a life-transcending level by freeing oneself from an attachment to life.

List of works
Collected Works [和辻哲郎全集], 27 vols. (Tokyo: Iwanami Shoten [岩波書店], 1961-91) [CW].

CW1
 Studies on Nietzsche [ニイチェ研究] (Tokyo: Uchida Rôkakuho [内田老鶴圃], 1913).
 Søren Kierkegaard [ゼエレン・キェルケゴオル] (Tokyo: Uchida Rôkakuho [内田老鶴圃], 1915).

CW2
 Pilgrimages to the Ancient Temples [古寺巡礼] (Tokyo: Iwanami Shoten [岩波書店], 1919).
 Katsura Imperial Villa: Investigating the Background Behind Its Style [桂離宮——様式の背後を探る] (Tokyo: Chûô Kôronsha [中央公論社], 1958).
 Originally published as Katsura Imperial Villa: Reflections on Its Construction Process [桂離宮——製作過程の考察] (Tokyo: Chûô Kôronsha [中央公論社], 1955), it was significantly rewritten after receiving criticism from the architectural historian Ôta Hirotarô.
 Eyes of the Haniwa Statue [人物埴輪の眼]
 What the Maijishan Grottoes Tell Us [麦積山塑像の示唆するもの]

CW3
 Ancient Japanese Culture [日本古代文化] (Tokyo: Iwanami Shoten [岩波書店], 1920).
 The Hidden Japan [埋もれた日本] (Tokyo: Shinchôsha [新潮社], 1951).

CW4
 Studies on Japanese Intellectual History, Vol. 1 [日本精神史研究] (Tokyo: Iwanami Shoten [岩波書店], 1926).
 Studies on Japanese Intellectual History, Vol. 2 [続日本精神史研究] (Tokyo: Iwanami Shoten [岩波書店], 1935).

CW5
 The Practical Philosophy of Early Buddhism [原始仏教の実践哲学] (Tokyo: Iwanami Shoten [岩波書店], 1927).
 The Beginnings of Buddhist Philosophy [仏教哲学の最初の展開]

CW6
 Professor Koeber [ケーベル先生] (Tokyo: Kôbundô [弘文堂], 1948).
 Critique of Homer [ホメーロス批判] (Tokyo: Kaname Shobô [要書房], 1946).
 Confucius [孔子] (Tokyo: Iwanami Shoten [岩波書店], 1938).
 Forerunners of the Modern Philosophy of History [近代歴史哲学の先駆者] (Tokyo: Kôbundô [弘文堂], 1950).
 On Vico among others.

CW7
 The Cultural Significance of Early Christianity [原始キリスト教の文化的意義] (Tokyo: Iwanami Shoten [岩波書店], 1926).
 Ethics of Humanity in the Polis [ポリス的人間の倫理学] (Tokyo: Hakujitsu Shoin [白日書院], 1948).

CW8
 Climate: Philosophico-Anthropological Reflections [風土——人間学的考察] (Tokyo: Iwanami Shoten [岩波書店], 1935).
 Pilgrimages to the Ancient Temples of Italy [イタリア古寺巡礼] (Tokyo: Kaname Shobô [要書房], 1950).

CW9
 Ethics as the Study of Humanity [人間の学としての倫理学] (Tokyo: Iwanami Shoten [岩波書店], 1934).
 Kant’s Critique of Practical Reason [カント実践理性批判] (Tokyo: Iwanami Shoten [岩波書店], 1935).
 Personality and Human Nature [人格と人類性] (Tokyo: Iwanami Shoten [岩波書店], 1938).

CW10
 Ethics, Vol. 1 [倫理学(上)] (Tokyo: Iwanami Shoten [岩波書店], 1937-49).

CW11
 Ethics, Vol. 2 [倫理学(下)] (Tokyo: Iwanami Shoten [岩波書店], 1937-49).

CW12
 A History of Japanese Ethical Thought, Vol. 1 [日本倫理思想史(上)] (Tokyo: Iwanami Shoten [岩波書店], 1952).

CW13
 A History of Japanese Ethical Thought, Vol. 2 [日本倫理思想史(下)] (Tokyo: Iwanami Shoten [岩波書店], 1952).

CW14
 Royalist Thought and Its Tradition [尊皇思想とその伝統] (Tokyo: Iwanami Shoten [岩波書店], 1943).
 The Way of the Imperial Subject in Japan [日本の臣道] (Tokyo: Chikuma Shobô [筑摩書房], 1944).
 Published together with The National Character of the United States [アメリカの国民性]. The book was banned and destroyed by SCAP during the US Occupation.
 The Symbol of National Unification [国民統合の象徴] (Tokyo: Keisô Shobô [勁草書房], 1948).

CW15
 Sakoku: Japan’s Tragedy [鎖国——日本の悲劇] (Tokyo: Chikuma Shobô [筑摩書房], 1950).

CW16
 Studies on the History of Japanese Art: Kabuki and  Jōruri [日本芸術史研究——歌舞伎と操り浄瑠璃] (Tokyo: Iwanami Shoten [岩波書店], 1955).

CW17
 The Revival of the Idol [偶像再興] (Tokyo: Iwanami Shoten [岩波書店], 1918).
 Mask and Persona [面とペルソナ] (Tokyo: Iwanami Shoten [岩波書店], 1937).
 The National Character of the United States [アメリカの国民性] (Tokyo: Chikuma Shobô [筑摩書房], 1944).
 Published together with The Way of the Imperial Subject in Japan [日本の臣道].

CW18
 An Attempt at Autobiography [自叙伝の試み] (Tokyo: Chûô Kôronsha [中央公論社], 1961).
 Unfinished work, posthumous publication.

CW19
 A History of Buddhist Ethical Thought [仏教倫理思想史]

CW20-24
 Essays

CW25
 Letters

CW26
 Lecture Notes

CW27
 Notes and Miscellanea

English translations
 1971: The Significance of Ethics As the Study of Man trans. from the introduction to  vol. 1 by David A. Dilworth (Monumenta Nipponica 26:3/4, 395-413) 
 1996: Watsuji Tetsurō's Rinrigaku: Ethics in Japan  trans. from the first half of  vol. 1 by Seisaku Yamamoto & Robert Carter (Albany: State University of New York Press)
 1998: Various essays in Sourcebook for Modern Japanese Philosophy by David Dilworth and Valdo Viglielmo with Agustin Jacinto Zavala.
 2021:  “Professor Koeber” trans. K.M.J. Shuttleworth and Sayaka Shuttleworth. The Journal of East Asian Philosophy 1: 75–99 (2021).
 2021:  “Middle School” from Attempt at an Autobiography trans. K.M.J. Shuttleworth and Sayaka Shuttleworth.  European Journal of Japanese Philosophy 6:  267–322 (2021).
 2021:  “America’s National Character” trans. K.M.J. Shuttleworth and Sayaka Shuttleworth. Philosophy East and West 71 (4):1005-1028 (2021)

See also
 Kuki Shūzō

Notes

References
 Maraldo, John C. (2001). "Watsuji" in A Companion to the Philosophers (Robert L. Arrington, editor). Oxford: Blackwell. 
 Marra, Michael F. (2002).  Japanese hermeneutics: Current Debates on Aesthetics and Interpretation. Honolulu: University of Hawai'i Press. ;  OCLC 237578040
 Mayeda, Graham. Japanese Philosophers on Society and Culture: Nishida Kitarō, Watsuji Tetsurō, and Kuki Shūzō. Lanham: Lexington Books, 2020. 
 ———. (2006). Time, Space and Ethics in the Philosophy of Watsuji Tetsurō, Kuki Shūzō, and Martin Heidegger. New York: Routledge.  (alk. paper).
 Hans Peter Liederbach (2001): Martin Heidegger im Denken Watsuji Tetsuros, München: Iudicium,

External links 

1889 births
1960 deaths
20th-century Japanese philosophers
Cultural historians
Academic staff of Hosei University
Intellectual historians
Japanese ethicists
Japanese nationalism
Japanese philosophers
Academic staff of Keio University
Kyoto School
Academic staff of Kyoto University
People from Himeji, Hyōgo
People of Shōwa-period Japan
Philosophers of art
Philosophers of religion
Recipients of the Order of Culture
Academic staff of Tsuda University
University of Tokyo alumni